Louis Lawson (25 October 19215 July 2009) was international motorcycle speedway motorcyclist who finished third in the 1949 Speedway World Championship final.

Career summary
Lawson was born in Southwell, Nottinghamshire, and spent his whole career with the Belle Vue Aces, winning the National Trophy three times. Lawson also featured in the England on eleven occasions.

World Final Appearances
 1949 -  London, Wembley Stadium - 3rd - 13pts
 1951 -  London, Wembley Stadium - 6th - 10pts
 1953 -  London, Wembley Stadium - Res - Did not ride

References

External links
 Louis Lawson - Belle Vue Aces

1921 births
2009 deaths
British speedway riders
Belle Vue Aces riders
People from Southwell, Nottinghamshire
Sportspeople from Nottinghamshire